The Naughtiest Girl Is a Monitor is a children's novel by Enid Blyton published in 1945, the third in The Naughtiest Girl series of novels.

Plot summary
Elizabeth  is chosen to be a monitor in Mr Jones’ Boarding School For Girls with her best friend Joan . Near the end of the holidays, a girl called Arabella comes to stay at Elizabeth's house as she will attend Whyteleafe the next term. Both girls hate  just being with each other the holidays were officially over, Elizabeth could not wait to get rid of Arabella, thinking she will be in the form above her because she was older. However, to her dismay, Arabella was in the first form too which made things very unpleasant for her that term. Julian ,Martin  and Rosemary were also the new children in her form and she made good friends with Julian, a bright and clever but do-as-I-wish boy. As the term progressed, Julian and Elizabeth had a fight, the first form had a midnight party, someone has started to play tricks on Elizabeth in class and there was a thief amongst the first formers!

After being sent out of class twice and making an unintentional but still untruthful complaint of Julian in the Meeting, she had to step down from being a monitor and a new one was selected. However, she learnt her lesson and after meeting with William, Rita and Julian, the two first formers were good friends once again. Only the mystery of the nasty thief in the first form is left to uncover.

Julian had a huge shock. He was told that his mother was extremely ill and that she might not survive. He was devastated as he loved his mother dearly. He vowed that from then on he will put his brains to good use and not just whenever he wanted to and to come up with tricks. After a while, he had the fortunate news that she is much better thanks to the new medicine his father and his two friends were making for so many years.  Martin also owned up to Elizabeth saying that he was the thief. Furious, Elizabeth calls Martin a mean coward when he said that he could not bear to own up to the Meeting, but she wondered why Martin was mean and kind at the same time, stealing people's things and money and yet generously giving it all away when people were unhappy. She looked through the big school Book for a case similar to his... At the weekly Meeting, Martin surprised Elizabeth by owning up to his wrongdoings. After knowing the reason why Martin did the things he did, the whole school discussed how they can help him not repeat his wrongdoing again and gave him a chance, this is the great thing about Whyteleafe School!

Near the end of the book, Elizabeth and Julian were out on a nature walk. While Julian left Elizabeth to find a special kind of moss, a little kid came near the lake she was at and drowned. She swam to the child, grabbed hold of him in the way she had been taught to and pulled him to shore, with the terrified kid nearly drowning her as well. On shore she showed the child's nurse how to do CPR or 'lifesaving work' and he was brought back to life. To reward her for her courageous action, the Meeting decided to make her an honorary monitor for until she left Whyteleafe.

New characters
Julian Holland
He is a chap with a 'devil-may-care' attitude. He has a quick brain which he uses to invent jokes and tricks. He is also one of Elizabeth's best friends. He doesn't want to work and achieve academic success at first but in the end he suddenly begins to work harder than ever before. This sudden change is due to his mother recovering from an illness. He has green eyes and black, scruffy hair.

Arabella Buckley
Arabella is an extremely spoiled, extremely rich girl who comes to stay at Elizabeth's during the holidays. Far more spoiled than Elizabeth was before Whyteleafe "cured" her of her naughtiness, Arabella seems to be obsessed with airs and graces and personal appearance.

Martin Follett
Martin is another new pupil at Whyteleafe. His eyes are described as being wide and innocent, but set "a little close together" (one recurring and controversial theme of Blyton is to categorise villains by appearance). He is kind and generous and appears to help when pupils' property goes missing, by giving them money or sweets apparently of his own. But other than for his kindness he is apparently overlooked by the other pupils and does not seem to have any friends.

External links
Enid Blyton Society page

Novels by Enid Blyton
1945 British novels
Novels set in boarding schools
1945 children's books
George Newnes Ltd books